Avraham "Avi" Shlaim  (born 31 October 1945) is an Israeli-British historian, Emeritus Professor of International Relations at the University of Oxford and fellow of the British Academy. He is one of Israel's New Historians, a group of Israeli scholars who put forward critical interpretations of the history of Zionism and Israel.

Biography
Avraham (Avi) Shlaim was born to wealthy Jewish parents in Baghdad, Iraq. The family lived in a mansion with ten servants. His father was an importer of building materials with ties to the Iraqi leadership, including then-prime minister Nuri al-Said.

In the 1930s, the situation of the Jews in Iraq deteriorated, with persecution of Jews further increasing in 1948, the year of Israel's independence. In 1951, during Operation Ezra and Nehemiah, Shlaim's family, along with most of Iraq's Jews, registered to emigrate to Israel and forfeit their Iraqi citizenship. A subsequent law ruled that all those who left forfeited all rights, including property rights. The Shlaim family lost all their property. His father crossed the border illegally on a mule, while Shlaim, his mother and sisters flew to Cyprus and from there were airlifted to Israel. The family reunited in Israel.

Shlaim grew up in Ramat Gan. He left Israel for England at the age of 16 to study at a Jewish school. He returned to Israel in 1964 to serve in the Israel Defense Forces, then moved back to England in 1966 to read history at Jesus College, Cambridge. He obtained his BA degree in 1969.<ref name="Oxf">Profile: Avi Shlaim University of Oxford</ref> He obtained an MSc (Econ.) in International Relations in 1970 from the London School of Economics and a PhD from the University of Reading. He was a lecturer and reader in politics in the University of Reading from 1970 to 1987.

He married the great-granddaughter of David Lloyd George, who was the British prime minister at the time of the Balfour Declaration. He has lived in the United Kingdom since 1966, and holds dual British and Israeli nationality.

Academic career
Shlaim taught international relations at Reading University, specialising in European issues. His academic interest in the history of Israel began in 1982, when Israeli government archives about the 1948 Arab–Israeli War were opened, an interest that deepened when he became a fellow of St Antony's College, Oxford in 1987. He was Alastair Buchan Reader in international relations at Oxford from 1987 to 1996 and director of graduate studies in that subject in 1993–1995 and 1998–2001. He held a British Academy research readership in 1995–97 and a research professorship in 2003–2006.

Shlaim served as an outside examiner on the doctoral thesis of Ilan Pappé. Shlaim's approach to the study of history is informed by his belief that "the historian's most fundamental task is not to chronicle but to evaluate... to subject the claims of all the protagonists to rigorous scrutiny and reject all those claims, however deeply cherished, that do not stand up."

Views and opinions
Shlaim is a regular contributor to The Guardian newspaper, and signed an open letter to that paper in January 2009 condemning Israel's role in the Gaza War.

Writing in the Spectator, Shlaim called Prime Minister Benjamin Netanyahu a "proponent of the doctrine of permanent conflict," describing his policies as an attempt to preclude a peaceful resolution to the conflict with Palestinians. Furthermore, he described Israeli foreign policy as one that supported stability of Arab regimes over nascent democratic movements during the Arab Spring.

Shlaim is a member of the UK Labour Party. In August 2015, he was a signatory to a letter criticising The Jewish Chronicles reporting of Jeremy Corbyn's association with alleged antisemites.

Criticism
The Israeli historians Joseph Heller and Yehoshua Porath have claimed that Shlaim "misleads his readers with arguments that Israel had missed the opportunity for peace while the Arabs are strictly peace seekers".

According to Yoav Gelber, Shlaim's claim that there was a deliberate and pre-meditated anti-Palestinian “collusion” between the Jewish Agency and King Abdullah, is unequivocally refuted by the documentary evidence on the development of contacts between Israel and Jordan before, during and after the war. Marc Lynch however wrote that "the voluminous evidence in [Gelber's] book does not allow so conclusive a verdict".

Israeli historian Benny Morris has harshly criticised Shlaim for what he claims is Shlaim's anti-Israel and pro-Arab bias. Morris accused Shlaim of consistently portraying Palestinian Arabs as the victims and their cause as righteous while vilifying the Zionist cause and Israel, and of distorting and omitting crucial information to give a one-sided portrayal of history. In a 2009 New Republic article titled "Derisionist History," Morris characterised Shlaim's work as full of "careless and inflammatory hyperbole" against Israel, while being "mealy-mouthed, hesitant, disingenuous, and laudatory" toward the Arabs.

Awards and recognition
In 2006, Shlaim was elected Fellow of the British Academy (FBA), the United Kingdom's national academy for the humanities and social sciences.

On 27 September 2017, Shlaim was awarded the British Academy Medal "for lifetime achievement".

Published works
 Collusion across the Jordan: King Abdullah, the Zionist Movement and the Partition of Palestine (winner of the 1988 Political Studies Association's W. J. M. Mackenzie Prize)The Politics of Partition (1990 and 1998)War and Peace in the Middle East: A Concise History (1995)The Cold War and the Middle East (co-editor, 1997)The Iron Wall: Israel and the Arab World (New York: W.W. Norton, 2001)Lion of Jordan: The Life of King Hussein in War and Peace (London: Allen Lane, 2007)Israel and Palestine: Reappraisals, Revisions, Refutations (London: Verso Books, 2009)The Iron Wall: Israel and the Arab World (London: Penguin Books, 2014)

See also

"The bride is beautiful, but she is married to another man"

References

External links
 Oxford home page
 Interview. The Nation, 28 June 2004.
 2009 Interview on Israeli-Palestinian conflict inc. video, audio and text transcript.
Video of discussion between Avi Shlaim and Shlomo Sand. Chaired by Jacqueline Rose at the Frontline Club, London, 12 November 2009
 Shlaim, Avi."The Balfour Declaration And its Consequences" in Louis, Wm. Roger, ed., Yet More Adventures with Britannia: Personalities, Politics and Culture in Britain'', London, I.B. Tauris, 2005, pp. 251–270.

1945 births
Living people
Academics of the University of Reading
Alumni of Jesus College, Cambridge
Alumni of the University of Reading
British historians
British people of Iraqi-Jewish descent
Fellows of the British Academy
Fellows of St Antony's College, Oxford
Historians of the Middle East
International relations scholars
Iraqi emigrants to Israel
Iraqi Jews
Jewish anti-Zionism in the United Kingdom
Jewish writers
Israeli Arab Jews
Israeli historians
Jewish historians
Labour Party (UK) people
New Historians
Recipients of the British Academy Medal
Writers from Baghdad
Academics from Baghdad